White Hart Halt was a short-lived railway halt in South Wales.

The halt was situated near the White Hart Inn. It was on both the 'up' and 'down' sections of the Pontypridd, Caerphilly and Newport Machen loop line.

The halt had a single ground-level platform with a wooden shelter, and a basic level crossing over the single line to give access to the shelter, which was on the side of the track furthest the road. The station was not staffed.

White Hart Halt closed on 30 June 1952. Little trace remains. The embankment which carried the line is still in existence, but is badly overgrown, making any remaining traces difficult to glimpse.

References

Disused railway stations in Caerphilly County Borough
Former Great Western Railway stations
Railway stations in Great Britain opened in 1947
Railway stations in Great Britain closed in 1952
1947 establishments in Wales
1952 disestablishments in Wales